The Division of Moreton is an Australian Electoral Division in Queensland.

History

The division was one of the original 65 divisions contested at the first federal election. It is named after Moreton Bay, and originally stretched from southern Brisbane all the way to the Gold Coast. While successive redistributions have left the seat completely landlocked, it has nonetheless retained the name of Moreton, mainly because the Australian Electoral Commission's guidelines on electoral redistributions require it to preserve the names of original electorates where possible.

The seat was in the hands of the Liberal Party and its predecessors for 86 years before Labor regained it in 1990. From then until 2013, it was a bellwether seat, electing the candidate from the winning party in every election.

The seat is known for having decided the 1961 federal election. The Liberals only won the seat by 130 votes to give the Coalition a bare one-seat majority; had 93 Communist preferences gone the other way, it would have resulted in a hung parliament.

On its current boundaries, the seat is very multicultural, with significant Asian, South Eastern European, Arab and African population in the southern part of the electorate particularly in the suburbs of Sunnybank, Acacia Ridge, Kuraby and Moorooka.

Boundaries
Since 1984, federal electoral division boundaries in Australia have been determined at redistributions by a redistribution committee appointed by the Australian Electoral Commission. Redistributions occur for the boundaries of divisions in a particular state, and they occur every seven years, or sooner if a state's representation entitlement changes or when divisions of a state are malapportioned.

Moreton is located in south east Queensland, and is based in the southern suburbs of the  City of Brisbane. The division includes Acacia Ridge, Archerfield, Chelmer, Fairfield, Graceville, Karawatha, Kuraby, MacGregor, Moorooka, Nathan, Oxley, Robertson, Rocklea, Runcorn, Salisbury, Stretton, Sunnybank, Sunnybank Hills, Tennyson, Yeronga, and Yeerongpilly, and parts of Algester, Berrinba, Calamvale, Coopers Plains, Drewvale, Eight Mile Plains, Parkinson, Sherwood, and Tarragindi, Corinda.

Members

Election results

References

External links
 Division of Moreton (Qld) — Australian Electoral Commission

Electoral divisions of Australia
Constituencies established in 1901
1901 establishments in Australia
Federal politics in Queensland